The đồng (Chữ Nôm: 銅; Chữ Hán: 元, nguyên) was the currency of North Vietnam from 3 November 1946 to 2 May 1978. It was subdivided into 10 hào, each itself divided into 10 xu.

History
The first đồng issued by the communists controlling northern Vietnam was introduced on January 31, 1946, and replaced the French Indochinese piastre at par. Two revaluations followed. In 1951, the second đồng was introduced at a rate of 1 1951 đồng = 100 1946 đồng. However, some sources say there were two consecutive revaluations in 1951 and 1953, each with factor of 10. In 1954, this became the currency of the newly recognized state of North Vietnam, with an exchange rate to the still circulating piastre and South Vietnamese đồng of 32 northern đồng = 1 piastre or southern đồng. In 1956, the đồng was pegged to the Chinese renminbi yuan at a rate of 1.47 đồng = 1 yuan.

On 28 February 1959, another đồng replaced the second at a rate of 1 1959 đồng = 1000 1951 đồng. An exchange rate with the Soviet rouble was established in 1961, with 3.27 đồng = 1 rouble. On May 3, 1978, following the unification of Vietnam, the đồng was also unified. 1 new đồng = 1 northern đồng = 0.8 southern "liberation" đồng.

Coins

1946 đồng 
In 1946, aluminium 20 xu, 5 hào and 1 đồng and bronze 2 đồng were issued, with the 20 xu coins dated 1945. These were the only coins issued for this currency, with no coins at all issued for the 1951 đồng.

1958 đồng 
In 1958, holed, aluminium coins in denominations of 1, 2 and 5 xu were introduced. These were the only coins issued in this currency.

Banknotes

1946 đồng
The government (Việt Nam Dân Chủ Cộng Hòa) issued two forms of paper money for this currency, "Vietnamese banknotes" (Giấy Bạc Việt Nam) and "Credit notes" (Tín Phiếu). In 1946, banknotes were introduced in denominations of 20 and 50 xu, 1, 5, 20, 50, 100 đồng, together with credit notes for 1 đồng. These were followed in 1948 by banknotes for 10 đồng and credit notes for 20 đồng, in 1949 by 500 đồng banknotes and 5 and 50 đồng credit notes, and in 1950 by 200 đồng banknotes and 100, 500 and 1000 đồng credit notes.

1951 đồng
In 1951, the National Bank of Vietnam (Ngân hàng quốc gia Việt Nam) introduced notes for 20, 50, 100, 200, 500 and 1000 đồng, with 5000 đồng notes added in 1953. These were the only circulating currency between 1951 and 1958.

1959 đồng
In 1958, the National Bank introduced notes for 1 xu, 1, 2 and 5 hào, 1, 2, 5 and 10 đồng, with the 1 xu notes an overprint on an earlier, unissued type of 10 đồng note. In 1964, the State Bank of Vietnam (Ngân hàng Nhà nước Việt Nam) introduced 2 xu notes, followed by 5 xu, 1 and 2 hào in 1975.

See also
 South Vietnamese đồng
 Economy of Vietnam

Gallery

Notes

References 

 Howard A. Daniel, III (1995) Democratic Republic of Vietnam Coins and Currency.

External links 

Collection Banknotes of Vietnam and the World
Coins and Banknotes of Vietnam and French Indochina

Currencies of Vietnam
Modern obsolete currencies
Currency symbols
Dong, North Vietnamese
1946 establishments in Vietnam
1978 disestablishments
Đồng